Greece competed in the Eurovision Song Contest 2003, held on 24 May 2003 at the Skonto Hall in Riga, Latvia. The Greek broadcaster Hellenic Broadcasting Corporation (ERT) organised a public selection process entitled Ena tragoudi gia tin Evropi ("A song for Europe") to determine its entry for the contest. Held on 26 February 2003 in Athens, the event saw 10 songs compete to be the Greek entry; the results were determined by a combination of jury, SMS and televoting. Singer Mando with the song "Never Let You Go" received the most votes and was selected to represent the nation. The song was written by Mando and Terry Siganos. 

To promote the entry, a music video and five track CD single for the song were released and Mando made appearances at events in Cyprus, Croatia and Malta, as well as at Mediterranean party in Riga in the lead up to the contest. "Never Let You Go" was performed 17th at the international contest on 24 May 2003 and at the close of the voting process, finished in 17th place, receiving 25 points from six countries.

Background 

The Hellenic Broadcasting Corporation (ERT) is the European Broadcasting Union (EBU) member for Greece and is responsible for selection of the nation's entry. Prior to the 2003 contest, Greece had participated in the Eurovision Song Contest twenty-three times since its first entry in 1974. Greece's least successful result was in  when it placed 20th with the song "Mia krifi evaisthisia" by Thalassa, receiving only twelve points in total, all from Cyprus.

Before Eurovision

Ena tragoudi gia tin Evropi 
Initially titled Psifiste gia to elliniko tragoudi ("Vote for the Greek Song"), Ena tragoudi gia tin Evropi ("A song for Europe") was the Greek selection process developed by ERT to select the Greek entry for the Eurovision Song Contest 2003. The competition took place on 26 February 2003 at the Ciné Keramikos Nightclub in Athens and was hosted by Dafni Bokota, Rika Vagiani and Popi Tsapanidou; it was televised on ET1 with a radio broadcast on Kosmos 93.6. The event was directed by Christos Fasois, produced by Stefanos Agorastakis and the sets were designed by Vassilis Tsirogiannis.

Competing entries 
Artists and composers had until 2 December 2002 to submit their entries. From all 243 entries submitted, ten entries were selected by a seven-member jury to participate in the national final. The jury consisted of past Eurovision contestants Evridiki (Cyprus  and ) and Paschalis Arvanitidis (Greece ), joined by Dafni Bokota, Giorgos Katsaros, Iro Trigoni, Johnny Kalimeris and Antonis Andrikakis. The competing artists were revealed on 10 February 2003 and the songs in their entirety were presented on 23 February 2003. Music videos of each competing entry aired on ET1 as part of the presentation and were rebroadcast over the three day period leading up to the event.

Final 
The final took place on 26 February 2003. Ten songs competed and the winner, "Never Let You Go" performed by Mando, was selected by a combination of jury voting (40%), SMS voting (which ran between 23 and 26 February 2003) (30%) and televoting (30%). The jury consisted of Katsaros, Rena Kapitsala, Giorgos Papastefanou, Johnny Kalimeris, Antonis Andrikakis, Munro Forbes and Eurovision Song Contest 2002 winner Marija Naumova. The selected song "Never Let You Go" was written by Mando herself along with Terry Siganos. The singer was well known in Greece, having tried to represent the nation in the past and having penned the song "Where You Are" for Jessica Simpson. Eurovision news website ESCToday noted that the scale of the national final was much larger than had been organised in the past for the Greek entry. These included Marinella's "Krasi, thalassa ke t'agori mou" (1974), Paschalis, Marianna, Robert and Bessy's "Mathima solfege" (1977), Tania Tsanaklidou's "Charlie Chaplin" (1978), Elpida's "Sokrati" (1979), Anna Vissi and the Epikouri's "Autostop" (1980), Bang's "Stop" (1987) and Antique's "Die for You" (2001). It also featured performances by Michalis Rakintzis singing Greece's 2002 entry "S.A.G.A.P.O." from the previous year as well as 2003 Cypriot representative Stelios Constantas singing his Eurovision entry "Feeling Alive".

Promotion
To promote the entry, "Never Let You Go" was a released as a CD single with five versions. It was later accompanied by a music video that was released in early May 2003. Directed by Kostas Kapetanidis, the video premiered on Greek music channel MAD TV. Mando also embarked on a promotional tour in the lead up the Eurovision Song Contest, appearing in Cyprus, Croatia and Malta, where she appeared on Maltese television. On 23 May, she attended the Mediterranean Party in Riga along with entrants from Cyprus, Spain, Malta and Israel, performing "Never Let You Go" in two versions.

At Eurovision

The Eurovision Song Contest 2003 took place at the Skonto Hall in Riga, Latvia, on 24 May 2003. According to the Eurovision rules, the participant list for the contest was composed of: the winning country from the previous year's contest; any countries which had not participated in the previous year's contest; and those which had obtained the highest placing in the previous contest, up to the maximum 26 participants in total. The draw for running order had previously been held on 29 November 2002 in Riga, with the results being revealed during a delayed broadcast of the proceedings later that day. The contest was broadcast within Greece on ET1 television and ERA radio with commentary by Dafni Bokota and Nikos Triboulidis, respectively.

"Never Let You Go" was performed 17th on the night (following Ukraine's Olexandr with "Hasta la vista" and preceding Norway's Jostein Hasselgård with "I'm Not Afraid to Move On"). For her Eurovision appearance, Mando wore a black gown with a very tight lace-up bodice. Her performance featured four backing vocalists, which included her sister and Alex Panayi.

Voting 
Televoting was an obligatory voting method for all participating countries, which awarded 1, 2, 3, 4, 5, 6, 7, 8, 10 and 12 points to their ten favourite songs, in ascending order. Countries voted in the same order as they had performed. At the close of voting, the performance had received 25 points, placing it 17th in the field of 26 entries. As Greece failed to reach the top 11 in the final, the country had to compete in the semi-final of the following year's contest.

Notes and references

Notes

References

Sources

 

2003
Countries in the Eurovision Song Contest 2003
Eurovision